LBC Express, Inc. (previously known as Luzon Brokerage Company) is a courier company based in the Philippines.

It operates scheduled commercial vehicle cargo services in currently and planned cargo airline services begin on May 31, 2014. As of 2016, LBC has over 1,252 branches in the Philippines, and over 60 branches in the United States and Canada. It also has branches in Hong Kong, Australia, Brunei, Malaysia, Singapore, Japan, Germany, United Arab Emirates, Spain, Kuwait, South Korea and Taiwan.

History
Luzon Brokerage Company was founded by Carlos Araneta of the Araneta family in the 1945 as a brokerage firm. With the help of his sons Juan Carlos, Santiago, and Fernando, Carlos Araneta expanded their family-owned business into an air cargo agency and later as a forwarding service provider to clients. As a third-party shipping provider, the company is responsible for dispatching shipments via asset-based carriers, and arranges shipment space for their customers. The company continued to expand their logistic services in 1973 and introduced the 24-hour overnight delivery services in the country later on.

In 1985, the first branch of LBC outside the country was established in San Francisco, California, in the United States. Along with the opening of its US-based branch, the company introduced the famous “Balikbayan Box” and their money remittance service to cater to Overseas Filipino Workers (OFW).

The moniker "Hari ng padala"  was created by the company in 1990. Products such as Branch Pick-up and Bills Payment were added in 2005, while the more secure mail service for personal documents, loose cargo, and container loads were introduced in 2010. The company also began to target business owners.

Advertising controversy
The company gained controversy in 2009 for an advertisement depicting a spelling bee where a child spells out the initials "L-B-C" for "remittance", "affordable", and "instant". Then-Department of Education secretary Jesli Lapus expressed disappointment over the advertisement, and urged the company to pull the commercial which has earned a "negative reaction from public for conveying a wrong message." Expressing concern over television's effects on children, Lapus further stressed that there are alternatives to further develop brand recognition, stating "The method used in this particular LBC advertisement may have unintended adverse consequences on the education of young televiewers" and "would certainly not contribute" to the education of young students.

Branding
The company silently re-branded in 2013.

The company has also introduced a new slogan, ‘We like to move it’ – which is inspired by the song "I Like to Move It" by American dance music band Reel 2 Real.

Sponsorships
The company has sponsored various sports events, personalities and teams in the Philippines.
 Kaya F.C.–Iloilo
 J. De Vega Sports Las Pinas
 West Sports Manila
 Talon Dos Lang Malakas Sports

References

Logistics companies of the Philippines
Express mail
Companies based in Pasay
Transport companies established in 1945
Companies listed on the Philippine Stock Exchange
Philippine companies established in 1945